A special election was held in  on October 1, 1805 to fill a vacancy resulting from the resignation of James A. Bayard, a Federalist, upon election to the Senate.  Bayard had earlier served in the House in the 5th, 6th, and 7th Congresses before being narrowly defeated for re-election in 1802 by Caesar A. Rodney, whom he, in turn, defeated in 1804.

Broom took his seat with the rest of the 9th Congress on December 2, 1805.

Election returns

Results by county

See also
1804 and 1805 United States House of Representatives elections
List of special elections to the United States House of Representatives

References

Special elections to the 9th United States Congress
Delaware 1805
Delaware
1805
1805 Delaware elections
United States House of Representatives 1805 At-large